The 1958 Mississippi Southern Southerners football team was an American football team that represented Mississippi Southern College (now known as the University of Southern Mississippi) as an independent during the 1958 NCAA College Division football season. In their tenth year under head coach Thad Vann, the team compiled a 9–0 record and finished as UPI College Division national champion.

Schedule

References

Mississippi Southern
College football undefeated seasons
NCAA Small College Football Champions
Southern Miss Golden Eagles football seasons
Mississippi Southern Southerners football